Eucalyptus fibrosa, commonly known as the red ironbark, broad-leaved red ironbark or broad-leaved red ironbark, is a species of medium-sized to tall tree endemic to eastern Australia. It has grey to black ironbark, lance-shaped to egg-shaped adult leaves, flower buds in groups of between seven and eleven, white flowers and conical fruit.

Description
It has rough, grey to black, sometimes flaky ironbark from the base of the trunk to the thinner branches. Flowering has been recorded in most months and the flowers are white.
with the valves close to rim level.

Some other ironbarks occurring in the same area including E. siderophloia, E. rhombica and E. decorticans are similar but all have smaller buds and fruit, and a much shorter operculum than that of E. fibrosa.

Taxonomy and naming
Eucalyptus fibrosa was first formally described in 1859 by Victorian state botanist Ferdinand von Mueller in 1859 from a collection from the Brisbane River and the description was published in Journal and Proceedings of the Linnean Society, Botany. The specific epithet (fibrosa) apparently refers to the bark, although possibly an inappropriate name for an ironbark.

In 1962, Lawrie Johnson and Robert Anderson described two subspecies and the names have been accepted by the Australian Plant Census:
 Eucalyptus fibrosa F.Muell.subsp. fibrosa;
 Eucalyptus fibrosa subsp. nubilis, (Maiden & Blakely) L.A.S.Johnson commonly known as the blue-leaved ironbark, differs from the autonym in having glaucous buds and fruit. This subspecies had previously been known as Eucalyptus nubilis Maiden & Blakely.

Distribution and habitat
Red ironbark grows in forest on shallow, relatively infertile soil. It is widespread on the coast, tablelands and nearby inland areas from near Rockhampton in Queensland to Moruya in New South Wales.

Conservation
This species is listed as "least concern" under the Queensland Government Nature Conservation Act 1992.

Gallery

See also
List of Eucalyptus species
Cooks River/Castlereagh Ironbark Forest

References

Myrtales of Australia
fibrosa
Flora of New South Wales
Flora of Queensland
Trees of Australia
Taxa named by Ferdinand von Mueller
Plants described in 1859